Zoom Rockman, born in , is a British cartoonist from England, whose comic strip Skanky Pigeon first appeared in The Beano when he was 12 years old. He is the youngest artist in the comic's history.

Education 
Rockman was educated at JCoSS.

Awards
Rockman was presented with the Achievement in Media award at the 2012 Spirit of London Awards.

In 2013, he was named to the Evening Standard's, "hottest 25 under-25s in the capital" list.

In 2019, Rockman won an award at the Ellwood Atfield cartoonists of the year ceremony.

References

2000 births
British cartoonists
Living people